John H. Enemark is an American chemist, focusing in bioinorganic chemistry, molybdenum-containing enzymes, pulsed EPR spectroscopy, X-ray crystallography and metal nitrosyls, currently the Regents Professor Emeritus at University of Arizona.

Education
 1962 – St. Olaf College, Northfield, Minnesota, B.A. (Chemistry)
 1964 – Harvard University, A.M., (Chemistry), R. H. Holm, thesis director
 1966 – Harvard University, Ph.D., (Chemistry), W. N. Lipscomb, Jr., thesis director

References

Fellows of the American Association for the Advancement of Science
University of Arizona faculty
21st-century American chemists
Living people
Harvard Graduate School of Arts and Sciences alumni
St. Olaf College alumni
Year of birth missing (living people)